Global War on Terrorism Medal may refer to:
 Global War on Terrorism Expeditionary Medal, a United States Armed Forces award
 Global War on Terrorism Service Medal, a United States Armed Forces award